The Alliance for Serbia was a major extra-parliamentary catch-all opposition alliance of political parties in Serbia that was founded in September 2018. The alliance boycotted the 2020 parliamentary election, due to claims that the elections would not be held under fair conditions. The alliance officially dissolved in August 2020, as the new alliance called United Opposition of Serbia was formed.

History
Coalition was founded by Dragan Đilas in September 2018. The political background of alliance members is diverse, with both left-wing, liberal, moderate, right-wing and far-right factions voicing opposition to the government. It is composed of the Democratic Party, Dveri, People's Party, Party of Freedom and Justice, as well some minor and local anti-government parties and organisations. They have called for the institution of a technocratic transitional government which would serve for a period of 1 year after which elections would be held.

The Alliance have supported protests against Vučić and have signed Agreement with people along with other opposition parties on 6 February.

The protests were precipitated by an assault on Borko Stefanović, one of the leaders of the Alliance. The non-partisan expert group, introduced during protests, concluded there were no conditions for free and fair elections in the country, due to the lack of public communication and inequality in that process, and they drafted a comprehensive and systematic document with six demands and six annexes. On September 16, 2019, the parties of the Alliance had taken a joint decision to boycott the coming parliamentary elections. In October, the first round of inter-party European Parliament-mediated dialogue took place, while the Alliance for Serbia refused to participate, stating that there is no time for their demands for fair election conditions to be met before April, when the election is scheduled.

Members

Parties that left coalition

Electoral results

Parliamentary elections

See also
United Opposition of Serbia, the successor of this political alliance.

References

External links
Alliance for Serbia Official website

2018 establishments in Serbia
2020 disestablishments in Serbia
Defunct political party alliances in Serbia
Political parties disestablished in 2020
Political parties established in 2018
Democracy movements
Political opposition organizations
Parliamentary groups